The 2022–23 Harvard Crimson women's basketball team represents Harvard University during the 2022–23 NCAA Division I women's basketball season. The Crimson, led by first-seventh year head coach Carrie Moore, play their home games at the Lavietes Pavilion and are members of the Ivy League. The Crimson qualified for the Ivy League women's tournament for the fifth season in a row. They advanced to the championships after defeating Columbia but fell to Princeton in the championship game. The Crimson accepted a bid to the 2023 WNIT.

Previous season
They finished the previous season 13–14, 7–7 in Ivy League play to finish in fourth place. They qualified for the 2022 Ivy League women's basketball tournament but lost to Princeton in the semifinals.

Roster

Schedule

|-
!colspan=8 style=| Non-conference regular season

|-
!colspan=8 style=| Ivy League regular season

|-
!colspan=8 style=| Ivy League Tournament

|-
!colspan=8 style=| WNIT

See also
 2022–23 Harvard Crimson men's basketball team

References

Harvard
Harvard Crimson women's basketball seasons
Harvard Crimson women's basketball
Harvard Crimson women's basketball
Harvard Crimson women's basketball
Harvard Crimson women's basketball